Alessandro Caparco (born 7 September 1983 in Moncalieri) is an Italian former footballer who played as a goalkeeper for teams such as Ivrea Calcio, Grosseto, CSMS Iași or Concordia Chiajna, among others.

Club career
Born in Moncalieri, Caparco started his career at lowly A.S.D. Moncalieri Calcio, and subsequently spent five years at A.S.D. Montalto Ivrea. In 2008, he moved to Serie B team U.S. Grosseto F.C., and played 19 games in his two-season spell.

Romania
In September 2010 the free agent Caparco moved abroad for the first time in his career, joining Liga I team FCM Târgu Mureş. He appeared regularly for the side but left the club in December 2013, and signed for Politehnica Iași in Liga II in the following month.

Ahead of the 2019-20 season, Caparco joined FC Dunărea Călărași.

Honours

US Ivrea Calcio
Serie D: 2002–03

CSMS Iași
Liga II: 2013–14

References

External links

1983 births
Living people
People from Moncalieri
Italian footballers
Association football goalkeepers
F.C. Grosseto S.S.D. players
ASA 2013 Târgu Mureș players
FC Politehnica Iași (2010) players
CS Concordia Chiajna players
FC Dunărea Călărași players
Serie B players
Liga I players
Liga II players
Italian expatriate footballers
Italian expatriate sportspeople in Romania
Expatriate footballers in Romania
Footballers from Piedmont
Sportspeople from the Metropolitan City of Turin